= Nanjing Week =

Annual city promotion event

Nanjing Week is a city promotion event sponsored by the Nanjing Provincial People's Government in China. The organizer has selected a world-renowned city each year to promote Nanjing's characteristics, landscape, history and culture since 2015, and expect to promote bilateral cultural exchanges, the event last for a week.

Since 2019, Nanjing Week merged with Nanjing Tech Week, becoming the international venues of Nanjing Tech Week.

== History ==
Previous Nanjing Week Host Cities
Year	City	Theme
2015	Milan, Italy	Expo Milano
2016	London, UK	London Design Festival
2017	New York, USA	New York Fashion Week
2018	Paris, France	Paris Double River Club
2019	San Francisco, USA	Nanjing Innovation Week Silicon Valley Station
